The Academy of Medicine, Singapore (AMS), is a professional and educational organisation for doctors and dentists in Singapore.

Background
The Academy of Medicine, Singapore, was founded in 1957 and served both Singapore and Malaysia until the union ended in 1965.  The autonomous Academy of Medicine of Malaysia was founded in 1966 by Malaysian members of the AMS.

AMS founders included: Professor Gordon Arthur Ransome, the Academy's first Master; Dr Benjamin Henry Sheares, former President of Singapore; and Dr Yeoh Ghim Seng, former Speaker of Parliament.

Fellowship
Fellowship of the Academy is denoted by the title FAMS (Fellow, Academy of Medicine, Singapore).  It is a recognised postgraduate medical qualification in Singapore.

Constituent colleges
 College of Anaesthesiologists
 College of Dental Surgeons
 College of Obstetricians and Gynaecologists
 College of Ophthalmologists
 College of Paediatrics and Child Health
 College of Physicians
 College of Public Health and Occupational Physicians
 College of Radiologists
 College of Surgeons
 College of Psychiatrists
 College of Emergency Physicians

Constituent chapters
 Chapter of Clinician Educators
 Chapter of Clinician Scientists
 Chapter of Pathologists
 Chapter of Family Medicine
 Chapter of Intensivists

See also
Academy of Medicine of Malaysia

References

Organizations established in 1957